Ten Thousand Mornings is an album by American singer/songwriter Peter Mulvey, released in 2002.

Reception

Writing for Allmusic, critic Ronnie D. Lankford, Jr. wrote of the album, "Mulvey's unusual covers and smart interpretations deliver fresh, non-pretentious takes on these tunes... Ten Thousand Mornings shows that even rock and pop songs can be altered into lovely acoustic music."

Track listing
"Stranded in a Limousine" (Paul Simon) – 2:37
"Inner City Blues (Make Me Wanna Holler)" (Marvin Gaye, James Nyx, Jr.) – 3:11
"Comes Love" (Sam H. Stept, Lew Brown, Charles Tobias) – 3:26
"Two Janes" (David Hidalgo, Louie Pérez) – 3:43	
"Running Up the Stairs" (Leo Kottke) – 3:10
"Mama, You Been on My Mind" (Bob Dylan) – 2:03
"Caleb Meyer" (David Rawlings, Gillian Welch) – 3:32
"In Germany Before the War" (Randy Newman) – 3:17
"Oliver's Army" (Elvis Costello) – 2:48
"For No One" (John Lennon, Paul McCartney) – 2:08
"Rain and Snow" (Traditional) – 2:53
"The Ocean" (Dar Williams) – 4:51

Personnel
Peter Mulvey – vocals, guitar
Chris Smither – vocals, guitar on "Stranded in a Limousine"
David "Goody" Goodrich – guitar on "Comes Love" and "Running Up the Stairs"
Mike Piehl – drums, background vocals on "Oliver's Army"
Jennifer Kimball – vocals
Erin McKeown – vocals on "Comes Love"
Anita Suhanin – vocals on "For No One"
Sean Staples – mandolin, background vocals on "Mama, You Been on My Mind"
Lou Ulrich – bass

Production notes
Dave Chalfant – mixing
Marc Donahue – mastering
Liz Linder – photography

References

Peter Mulvey albums
2002 albums